Eulabelle Moore (1903 - 1964) was an American actress who had roles in Broadway productions and had a role in the film The Horror of Party Beach.

Career
Moore had roles in 15 Broadway productions including A Streetcar Named Desire (1950), The Male Animal (1952), and Great Day in the Morning (1962). She was originally part of the cast of The Fundamental George as a maid, but she could not perform because she was ill. Helen Bonfils took over the role, but in blackface. John Gerstad stated, "She never was very good, certainly not comparable with Eulabelle, who is an accomplished comedy actress".  Moore has received other positive reception from her Broadway roles. In a review of Danger - Men Working, The Philadelphia Inquirer wrote, "Eulabelle Moore won applause as the janitress who sees all and tells all of the goings-on in an apartment house".  Gladys March, in an Asbury Park Press review of Here Today wrote, "And Eulabelle Moore as Gertude, evokes many of the deep belly-laughs from her hearty portrayal of the maid".

Moore also had a role in the 1964 film The Horror of Party Beach. Mark Burger of Yes! Weekly wrote, "In one of the story's most dated aspects, Eulabelle Moore (who died shortly after the film's release) plays Laurel's housekeeper "Eulabelle," whose comic rants about voodoo make for a cringing stereotype – although, to be fair, it's Eulabelle who accidentally figures out how to destroy the creatures." Charleston Picou of Horror News said, "Then there's the racism. We have the African American character Eulabelle, who works as a maid to Dr. Gavin, the main scientist in the film. Eulabelle was a repulsive stereotype common in movies of the era. She was there just to jabber on about a possible supernatural reason for the fishmen and be in near hysterics at all times as events unfold. She's treated with a certain level of condescension from the white characters for the majority of the film. It was so bad and patronizing that I half expected to see one of the other characters pat her at the top of the head."

References

1903 births
1964 deaths
African-American actresses
20th-century American actresses
American stage actresses
20th-century African-American women
20th-century African-American people